The 2020–21 UC Davis Aggies men's basketball team represented the University of California, Davis in the 2020–21 NCAA Division I men's basketball season. The Aggies, led by Jim Les in his tenth season with the program, played their games at The Pavilion in Davis, California as members of the Big West Conference.

Previous season 

The Aggies finished the 2019–20 season 14–18 overall, 8–8 in Big West play to finish tied for fourth in the Big West standings. Initially set to play Hawaii in the first round of the Big West Conference tournament, the tournament was cancelled due to the COVID-19 pandemic, ending the Aggies season.

Roster

Schedule and results 

|-
!colspan=9 style=| Regular season

|-
!colspan=9 style=| Big West tournament

Source:

References 

UC Davis Aggies men's basketball seasons
UC Davis
UC Davis Aggies men's basketball
UC Davis Aggies men's basketball